Gilbira (Gelbere) is a rural locality (an ulus) in Ivolginsky District, Republic of Buryatia, Russia. The population was 93 as of 2010. There are 10 streets.

Geography 
Gilbira is located 37 km southwest of Ivolginsk (the district's administrative centre) by road. Kokorino is the nearest rural locality.

References 

Rural localities in Ivolginsky District